Those of You with or Without Children, You'll Understand is the 19th comedy album by Bill Cosby. It was his first of two for Geffen Records and the first album to be produced by his wife Camille. The album was recorded at The Syria Mosque, Pittsburgh, PA, and The Riverfront Coliseum, Cincinnati, OH. It won the 1987 Grammy Award for Best Comedy Album.

Track listing
Side 1
 Genesis - 18:02
 The Great Quote - 4:10

Side 2
 Window of Life - 26:56

Bill Cosby live albums
Stand-up comedy albums
Spoken word albums by American artists
Live spoken word albums
1986 live albums
Geffen Records live albums
Grammy Award for Best Comedy Album
1980s comedy albums